Lucky Core Industries Limited, previously known as ICI Pakistan Limited, is a Pakistani chemical company which is based in Karachi, Pakistan. It manufactures polyester, pharmaceutical, agrochemical, soda ash and animal health products.

History
The company's history dates back to British colonial-era when it was established as Khewra Soda Ash Company in 1944. They set up a soda ash manufacturing facility in Khewra, Punjab, Pakistan with a capacity of 18,000 tonnes per annum. This facility was sited next to the Khewra salt range, Punjab, Pakistan because rock salt and limestone; two key raw materials for manufacturing soda ash were available.

In 1995, ICI Pakistan Limited set up a US$490 million PTA manufacturing facility at Port Qasim, near Karachi, which was commissioned in 1998. In 2001, the business was demerged or spun off to form Pakistan PTA Limited, a subsidiary of ICI Plc UK. 

In 2008, Dutch paints and chemicals giant AkzoNobel bought out the global parent company Imperial Chemical Industries (ICI).

ICI Pakistan is one of the largest quoted companies on the Pakistan Stock Exchange with a paid up share capital of Rs 1.39 billion. The company has around 1,294 permanent employees and around the same numbers of people provide services through contractual arrangements.

In 2012, Yunus Brothers Group acquired the company for $152m from the Dutch paints giant AkzoNobel.

In 2022, the company was renamed as Lucky Core Industries.

Businesses

Polyester
ICI Pakistan pioneered polyester staple fibre (PSF) technology in Pakistan through its investment in a 12,000 tonnes per annum PSF plant commissioned in 1982 in Sheikhupura, near Lahore. Polyester fibre is used in cars, bedding and clothes.

Soda ash
While the soda ash plant dates back to 1939, commercial production began in 1944. Over the years, the capacity of the plant has been increased through expansion in line with market demand. The total capacity of the plant today is 500,000 tons per annum. Besides, the business also has a production capacity of 630 tons per day of dense ash (Na2CO3.H2O), which is an essential raw material for glass making, and 160 tons per day of Refined Sodium Bicarbonate.

ICI Pakistan's soda ash business caters to approximately 70% of the country's total soda ash requirement. The business mainly uses indigenous raw materials and locally made equipment. The plant is located in Khewra, near the Khewra salt range.

Pharmaceuticals
ICI Pakistan Limited entered into the manufacturing sphere in both pharmaceuticals and nutraceuticals, through the acquisition and set-up of several state-of-the-art manufacturing facilities.

The Company has two fully equipped facilities for pharmaceutical manufacturing including:

 Wholly owned subsidiary Cirin Pharmaceuticals (Private) Limited, which has its manufacturing facility in Hattar, KPK. The products manufactured at our Cirin plant include; anti-infectives, sterile liquid injectables, oral solid dosage, anti-virals, analgesics, gastroenterology, intensive care and anxiolytics.
 Manufacturing facility at Hawke’s Bay Road, Karachi. Acquired from Wyeth Pakistan Limited.

Animal Health 
ICI Pakistan Limited's Animal Health business offers products encompassing a wide range of therapeutic categories: anthelmintics, antiprotozoals, antibacterials, restoratives, intrauterine, udder health, growth promoters, disinfectants, dairy and poultry nutrition, insemination, and biologicals catering to the industry’s livestock and poultry segments.

The business has partnered with leading animal health companies of the world including MSD Animal Health, Elanco, Bayer Animal Health,Trouw Nutrition, Lanxess, Mervue Laboratories, Cogent Breeding UK, ST Genetics, Berg + Schmidt, Choong Ang Vaccine Laboratories (CAVAC), Champrix, Vemo 99 Ltd and Norbrook Laboratories to create international synergies and bring global advancements to Pakistan.

Chemicals & Agri Sciences
ICI Pakistan Chemicals and Agri Sciences business consists of General Chemicals and Specialty Chemicals (formerly Uniqema) as well as Agriculture Products ranging from seeds to pesticides.

The General Chemicals Segment includes trading and polyurethanes and is involved in the import, manufacturing, sale and distribution of industrial chemicals. The trading segment comprises a portfolio of fourteen product groupings with over 250 products/variants, including trading partners such as National Starch & Chemicals, Huntsman Polyurethanes, Ineos Chlor, Nalco, Huntsman Tioxide, supplemented by imports of complementary product lines from companies in the US, Europe and the Far East. This Segment markets a product range used for various applications including power, cement, textiles, paints, pharmaceuticals, personal care, food & beverage, solvents, detergents, footwear and household appliances.

Infant milk formula
Since 2014, ICI Pakistan is importing, marketing and distributing selected Morinaga Milk Industry of Japan's infant milk formula products under the brand name of NutriCo Pakistan.

Factories
ICI Pakistan operates factories in the following cities:
 Lahore
 Sheikhupura
 Khewra
 Karachi
 Hattar, Pakistan

Awards and recognition
In 2018, ICI Pakistan was awarded the Gallup Pakistan's 'Gallup Great Workplace Award'.

References

External links
 
 Company Profile and stock quote of ICI Pakistan on Pakistan Stock Exchange website

Yunus Brothers Group
1944 establishments in British India
Chemical companies of Pakistan
Chemical companies established in 1944
Companies listed on the Pakistan Stock Exchange
Manufacturing companies based in Karachi
2012 mergers and acquisitions
Mergers and acquisitions of Pakistani companies